Gedolim pictures are photos or sketches of (or attributed to) famous rabbis, known as gedolim (Hebrew for "great people"), who are admired by Jews. 

It is a cultural phenomenon found largely in the Orthodox and more specifically Haredi Jewish communities. Gedolim pictures are pictures of famous rabbis and other prominent Jews which are circulated amongst the Jewish communities. Quite frequently, these pictures are posted on the walls of offices, businesses, houses, and schools where Jews are present. 

Collecting Gedolim pictures has developed into a hobby for many Jewish children around the world; it is similar to collecting sports cards.

Tsemach Glenn, Matis Goldberg, and Avraham Elbaz are renowned in the Jewish community for their photography of Gedolim. Elazar Kalman Tiefenbrun (aka E.K. Tiefenbrun), a Chabad painter, is renowned for his numerous paintings of Gedolim, specifically, but not exclusively, of Lubavitcher Rebbes.

Books 
In recent years, several books, dedicated to their display of gedolim pictures, have been published.

Examples of Gedolim pictures 
Many of these pictures are the most commonly used pictures of the rabbis featured in them.

See also
:Category:Images of Haredi rabbis
:Category:Images of Hasidic rebbes

References

Ephemera
Haredi Judaism
Haredi rabbis